Cantor's first set theory article contains Georg Cantor's first theorems of transfinite set theory, which studies infinite sets and their properties. One of these theorems is his "revolutionary discovery" that the set of all real numbers is uncountably, rather than countably, infinite. This theorem is proved using Cantor's first uncountability proof, which differs from the more familiar proof using his diagonal argument. The title of the article, "On a Property of the Collection of All Real Algebraic Numbers" ("Ueber eine Eigenschaft des Inbegriffes aller reellen algebraischen Zahlen"), refers to its first theorem: the set of real algebraic numbers is countable. Cantor's article was published in 1874. In 1879, he modified his uncountability proof by using the topological notion of a set being dense in an interval.

Cantor's article also contains a proof of the existence of transcendental numbers. Both constructive and non-constructive proofs have been presented as "Cantor's proof." The popularity of presenting a non-constructive proof has led to a misconception that Cantor's arguments are non-constructive. Since the proof that Cantor published either constructs transcendental numbers or does not, an analysis of his article can determine whether or not this proof is constructive. Cantor's correspondence with Richard Dedekind shows the development of his ideas and reveals that he had a choice between two proofs: a non-constructive proof that uses the uncountability of the real numbers and a constructive proof that does not use uncountability.

Historians of mathematics have examined Cantor's article and the circumstances in which it was written. For example, they have discovered that Cantor was advised to leave out his uncountability theorem in the article he submitted — he added it during proofreading. They have traced this and other facts about the article to the influence of Karl Weierstrass and Leopold Kronecker. Historians have also studied Dedekind's contributions to the article, including his contributions to the theorem on the countability of the real algebraic numbers. In addition, they have recognized the role played by the uncountability theorem and the concept of countability in the development of set theory, measure theory, and the Lebesgue integral.

The article
Cantor's article is short, less than four and a half pages. It begins with a discussion of the real algebraic numbers and a statement of his first theorem: The set of real algebraic numbers can be put into one-to-one correspondence with the set of positive integers. Cantor restates this theorem in terms more familiar to mathematicians of his time: The set of real algebraic numbers can be written as an infinite sequence in which each number appears only once.

Cantor's second theorem works with a closed interval [a, b], which is the set of real numbers ≥ a and ≤ b. The theorem states: Given any sequence of real numbers x1, x2, x3, ... and any interval [a, b], there is a number in [a, b] that is not contained in the given sequence. Hence, there are infinitely many such numbers.

Cantor observes that combining his two theorems yields a new proof of Liouville's theorem that every interval [a, b] contains infinitely many transcendental numbers.

Cantor then remarks that his second theorem is:

This remark contains Cantor's uncountability theorem, which only states that an interval [a, b] cannot be put into one-to-one correspondence with the set of positive integers. It does not state that this interval is an infinite set of larger cardinality than the set of positive integers. Cardinality is defined in Cantor's next article, which was published in 1878.

Cantor only states his uncountability theorem. He does not use it in any proofs.

The proofs

First theorem

To prove that the set of real algebraic numbers is countable, define the height of a polynomial of degree n with integer coefficients as: n − 1 + |a0| + |a1| + ... + |an|, where a0, a1, ..., an are the coefficients of the polynomial. Order the polynomials by their height, and order the real roots of polynomials of the same height by numeric order. Since there are only a finite number of roots of polynomials of a given height, these orderings put the real algebraic numbers into a sequence. Cantor went a step further and produced a sequence in which each real algebraic number appears just once. He did this by only using polynomials that are irreducible over the integers. The following table contains the beginning of Cantor's enumeration.

Second theorem
Only the first part of Cantor's second theorem needs to be proved. It states: Given any sequence of real numbers x1, x2, x3, ... and any interval [a, b], there is a number in [a, b] that is not contained in the given sequence.

To find a number in [a, b] that is not contained in the given sequence, construct two sequences of real numbers as follows: Find the first two numbers of the given sequence that are in the open interval (a, b). Denote the smaller of these two numbers by a1 and the larger by b1.  Similarly, find the first two numbers of the given sequence that are in (a1, b1). Denote the smaller by a2 and the larger by b2. Continuing this procedure generates a sequence of intervals (a1, b1), (a2, b2), (a3, b3), ... such that each interval in the sequence contains all succeeding intervals—that is, it generates a sequence of nested intervals. This implies that the sequence a1, a2, a3, ... is increasing and the sequence b1, b2, b3, ... is decreasing.

Either the number of intervals generated is finite or infinite. If finite, let (aL, bL) be the last interval. If infinite, take the limits a∞ = limn → ∞ an and b∞ = limn → ∞ bn. Since an < bn for all n, either a∞ = b∞ or a∞ < b∞. Thus, there are three cases to consider:

Case 1: There is a last interval (aL, bL). Since at most one xn can be in this interval, every y in this interval except xn (if it exists) is not in the given sequence.

Case 2: a∞ = b∞. Then a∞ is not in the sequence since for all n: a∞ is in the interval (an, bn) but  xn does not belong to (an, bn). In symbols: a∞ ∈ (an, bn) but xn ∉ (an, bn).

{| class="wikitable collapsible collapsed"
! style="background: f5f5f5;" |Proof that for all n:  
|- style="text-align: left; vertical-align: top; background: white" 
| style="padding-left: 1em; padding-right: 1em" | This lemma is used by cases 2 and 3. It is implied by the stronger lemma: For all n, (an, bn) excludes x1, ..., x2n. This is proved by induction. Basis step: Since the endpoints of (a1, b1) are x1 and x2 and an open interval excludes its endpoints, (a1, b1) excludes x1, x2. Inductive step: Assume that (an, bn) excludes x1, ..., x2n. Since (an+1, bn+1) is a subset of (an, bn) and its endpoints are x2n+1 and x2n+2, (an+1, bn+1) excludes x1, ..., x2n and x2n+1, x2n+2. Hence, for all n, (an, bn) excludes x1, ..., x2n. Therefore, for all n, xn ∉ (an, bn).
|}

Case 3: a∞ < b∞. Then every y in [a∞, b∞] is not contained in the given sequence since for all n: y belongs to (an, bn) but xn does not.

The proof is complete since, in all cases, at least one real number in [a, b] has been found that is not contained in the given sequence.

Cantor's proofs are constructive and have been used to write a computer program that generates the digits of a transcendental number. This program applies Cantor's construction to a sequence containing all the real algebraic numbers between 0 and 1. The article that discusses this program gives some of its output, which shows how the construction generates a transcendental.

Example of Cantor's construction
An example illustrates how Cantor's construction works. This sequence is obtained by ordering the rational numbers in (0, 1) by increasing denominators, ordering those with the same denominator by increasing numerators, and omitting reducible fractions. The table below shows the first five steps of the construction. The table's first column contains the intervals (an, bn). The second column lists the terms visited during the search for the first two terms in (an, bn). These two terms are in red.

Since the sequence contains all the rational numbers in (0, 1), the construction generates an irrational number, which turns out to be  − 1.

Cantor's 1879 uncountability proof

Everywhere dense 
In 1879, Cantor published a new uncountability proof that modifies his 1874 proof. He first defines the topological notion of a point set P being "everywhere dense in an interval":

If P lies partially or completely in the interval [α, β], then the remarkable case can happen that every interval [γ, δ] contained in [α, β], no matter how small, contains points of P.  In such a case, we will say that P is everywhere dense in the interval [α, β].

In this discussion of Cantor's proof: a, b, c, d are used instead of α, β, γ, δ. Also, Cantor only uses his interval notation if the first endpoint is less than the second. For this discussion, this means that (a, b) implies a < b.

Since the discussion of Cantor's 1874 proof was simplified by using open intervals rather than closed intervals, the same simplification is used here. This requires an equivalent definition of everywhere dense: A set P is everywhere dense in the interval [a, b] if and only if every open subinterval (c, d) of [a, b] contains at least one point of P.

Cantor did not specify how many points of P an open subinterval (c, d) must contain. He did not need to specify this because the assumption that every open subinterval contains at least one point of P implies that every open subinterval contains infinitely many points of P.

Cantor's 1879 proof 
Cantor modified his 1874 proof with a new proof of its second theorem: Given any sequence P of real numbers x1, x2, x3, ... and any interval [a, b], there is a number in [a, b] that is not contained in P. Cantor's new proof has only two cases. First, it handles the case of P not being dense in the interval, then it deals with the more difficult case of P being dense in the interval. This division into cases not only indicates which sequences are more difficult to handle, but it also reveals the important role denseness plays in the proof.

In the first case, P is not dense in [a, b]. By definition, P is dense in [a, b] if and only if for all subintervals (c, d) of [a, b], there is an x ∈ P such that . Taking the negation of each side of the "if and only if" produces: P is not dense in [a, b] if and only if there exists a subinterval (c, d) of [a, b] such that for all x ∈ P: . Therefore, every number in (c, d) is not contained in the sequence P. This case handles case 1 and case 3 of Cantor's 1874 proof.

In the second case, which handles case 2 of Cantor's 1874 proof, P is dense in [a, b]. The denseness of sequence P is used to recursively define a sequence of nested intervals that excludes all the numbers in P and whose intersection contains a single real number in [a, b]. The sequence of intervals starts with (a, b). Given an interval in the sequence, the next interval is obtained by finding the two numbers with the least indices that belong to P and to the current interval. These two numbers are the endpoints of the next open interval. Since an open interval excludes its endpoints, every nested interval eliminates two numbers from the front of sequence P, which implies that the intersection of the nested intervals excludes all the numbers in P.  Details of this proof and a proof that this intersection contains a single real number in [a, b] are given below.

The development of Cantor's ideas
The development leading to Cantor's 1874 article appears in the correspondence between Cantor and Richard Dedekind. On November 29, 1873, Cantor asked Dedekind whether the collection of positive integers and the collection of positive real numbers "can be corresponded so that each individual of one collection corresponds to one and only one individual of the other?" Cantor added that collections having such a correspondence include the collection of positive rational numbers, and collections of the form (an1, n2, . . . , nν) where n1, n2, . . . , nν, and ν are positive integers.

Dedekind replied that he was unable to answer Cantor's question, and said that it "did not deserve too much effort because it has no particular practical interest." Dedekind also sent Cantor a proof that the set of algebraic numbers is countable.

On December 2, Cantor responded that his question does have interest: "It would be nice if it could be answered; for example, provided that it could be answered no, one would have a new proof of Liouville's theorem that there are transcendental numbers."

On December 7, Cantor sent Dedekind a proof by contradiction that the set of real numbers is uncountable. Cantor starts by assuming that the real numbers in  can be written as a sequence. Then, he applies a construction to this sequence to produce a number in  that is not in the sequence, thus contradicting his assumption. Together, the letters of December 2 and 7 provide a non-constructive proof of the existence of transcendental numbers. Also, the proof in Cantor's December 7th letter shows some of the reasoning that led to his discovery that the real numbers form an uncountable set.

Dedekind received Cantor's proof on December 8. On that same day, Dedekind simplified the proof and mailed his proof to Cantor. Cantor used Dedekind's proof in his article. The letter containing Cantor's December 7th proof was not published until 1937.

On December 9, Cantor announced the theorem that allowed him to construct transcendental numbers as well as prove the uncountability of the set of real numbers:

This is the second theorem in Cantor's article. It comes from realizing that his construction can be applied to any sequence, not just to sequences that supposedly enumerate the real numbers. So Cantor had a choice between two proofs that demonstrate the existence of transcendental numbers: one proof is constructive, but the other is not. These two proofs can be compared by starting with a sequence consisting of all the real algebraic numbers.

The constructive proof applies Cantor's construction to this sequence and the interval [a, b] to produce a transcendental number in this interval.

The non-constructive proof uses two proofs by contradiction:
 The proof by contradiction used to prove the uncountability theorem (see Proof of Cantor's uncountability theorem).
 The proof by contradiction used to prove the existence of transcendental numbers from the countability of the real algebraic numbers and the uncountability of real numbers. Cantor's December 2nd letter mentions this existence proof but does not contain it. Here is a proof: Assume that there are no transcendental numbers in [a, b]. Then all the numbers in [a, b] are algebraic. This implies that they form a subsequence of the sequence of all real algebraic numbers, which contradicts Cantor's uncountability theorem. Thus, the assumption that there are no transcendental numbers in [a, b] is false. Therefore, there is a transcendental number in [a, b].

Cantor chose to publish the constructive proof, which not only produces a transcendental number but is also shorter and avoids two proofs by contradiction. The non-constructive proof from Cantor's correspondence is simpler than the one above because it works with all the real numbers rather than the interval [a, b]. This eliminates the subsequence step and all occurrences of [a, b] in the second proof by contradiction.

A misconception about Cantor's work 
Akihiro Kanamori, who specializes in set theory, stated that "Accounts of Cantor's work have mostly reversed the order for deducing the existence of transcendental numbers, establishing first the uncountability of the reals and only then drawing the existence conclusion from the countability of the algebraic numbers. In textbooks the inversion may be inevitable, but this has promoted the misconception that Cantor's arguments are non-constructive." 

Cantor's published proof and the reverse-order proof both use the theorem: Given a sequence of reals, a real can be found that is not in the sequence. By applying this theorem to the sequence of real algebraic numbers, Cantor produced a transcendental number. He then proved that the reals are uncountable: Assume that there is a sequence containing all the reals. Applying the theorem to this sequence produces a real not in the sequence, contradicting the assumption that the sequence contains all the reals. Hence, the reals are uncountable. The reverse-order proof starts by first proving the reals are uncountable. It then proves that transcendental numbers exist: If there were no transcendental numbers, all the reals would be algebraic and hence countable, which contradicts what was just proved. This contradiction proves that transcendental numbers exist without constructing any.

The correspondence containing Cantor's non-constructive reasoning was published in 1937. By then, other mathematicians had rediscovered his non-constructive, reverse-order proof. As early as 1921, this proof was called "Cantor's proof" and criticized for not producing any transcendental numbers. In that year, Oskar Perron gave the reverse-order proof and then stated: "… Cantor's proof for the existence of transcendental numbers has, along with its simplicity and elegance, the great disadvantage that it is only an existence proof; it does not enable us to actually specify even a single transcendental number."

As early as 1930, some mathematicians have attempted to correct this misconception of Cantor's work. In that year, the set theorist Abraham Fraenkel stated that Cantor's method is "… a method that incidentally, contrary to a widespread interpretation, is fundamentally constructive and not merely existential." In 1972, Irving Kaplansky wrote: "It is often said that Cantor's proof is not 'constructive,' and so does not yield a tangible transcendental number. This remark is not justified. If we set up a definite listing of all algebraic numbers … and then apply the diagonal procedure …, we get a perfectly definite transcendental number (it could be computed to any number of decimal places)." Cantor's proof is not only constructive, it is also simpler than Perron's proof, which requires the detour of first proving that the set of all reals is uncountable.

Cantor's diagonal argument has often replaced his 1874 construction in expositions of his proof. The diagonal argument is constructive and produces a more efficient computer program than his 1874 construction. Using it, a computer program has been written that computes the digits of a transcendental number in polynomial time. The program that uses Cantor's 1874 construction requires at least sub-exponential time.

The presentation of the non-constructive proof without mentioning Cantor's constructive proof appears in some books that were quite successful as measured by the length of time new editions or reprints appeared—for example: Oskar Perron's Irrationalzahlen (1921; 1960, 4th edition), Eric Temple Bell's Men of Mathematics (1937; still being reprinted), Godfrey Hardy and E. M. Wright's An Introduction to the Theory of Numbers (1938; 2008 6th edition), Garrett Birkhoff and Saunders Mac Lane's A Survey of Modern Algebra (1941; 1997 5th edition), and Michael Spivak's Calculus (1967; 2008 4th edition). Since 2014, at least two books have appeared stating that Cantor's proof is constructive, and at least four have appeared stating that his proof does not construct any (or a single) transcendental.

Asserting that Cantor gave a non-constructive argument without mentioning the constructive proof he published can lead to erroneous statements about the history of mathematics. In A Survey of Modern Algebra, Birkhoff and Mac Lane state: "Cantor's argument for this result [Not every real number is algebraic] was at first rejected by many mathematicians, since it did not exhibit any specific transcendental number." The proof that Cantor published produces transcendental numbers, and there appears to be no evidence that his argument was rejected. Even Leopold Kronecker, who had strict views on what is acceptable in mathematics and who could have delayed publication of Cantor's article, did not delay it. In fact, applying Cantor's construction to the sequence of real algebraic numbers produces a limiting process that Kronecker accepted—namely, it determines a number to any required degree of accuracy.

The influence of Weierstrass and Kronecker on Cantor's article 

Historians of mathematics have discovered the following facts about Cantor's article "On a Property of the Collection of All Real Algebraic Numbers":

 Cantor's uncountability theorem was left out of the article he submitted. He added it during proofreading.
 The article's title refers to the set of real algebraic numbers. The main topic in Cantor's correspondence was the set of real numbers.
 The proof of Cantor's second theorem came from Dedekind. However, it omits Dedekind's explanation of why the limits a∞ and b∞ exist.
 Cantor restricted his first theorem to the set of real algebraic numbers. The proof he was using demonstrates the countability of the set of all algebraic numbers.

To explain these facts, historians have pointed to the influence of Cantor's former professors, Karl Weierstrass and Leopold Kronecker. Cantor discussed his results with Weierstrass on December 23, 1873. Weierstrass was first amazed by the concept of countability, but then found the countability of the set of real algebraic numbers useful. Cantor did not want to publish yet, but Weierstrass felt that he must publish at least his results concerning the algebraic numbers.

From his correspondence, it appears that Cantor only discussed his article with Weierstrass. However, Cantor told Dedekind: "The restriction which I have imposed on the published version of my investigations is caused in part by local circumstances …" Cantor biographer Joseph Dauben believes that "local circumstances" refers to Kronecker who, as a member of the editorial board of Crelle's Journal, had delayed publication of an 1870 article by Eduard Heine, one of Cantor's colleagues. Cantor would submit his article to Crelle's Journal.

Weierstrass advised Cantor to leave his uncountability theorem out of the article he submitted, but Weierstrass also told Cantor that he could add it as a marginal note during proofreading, which he did. It appears in a 
remark at the end of the article's introduction. The opinions of Kronecker and Weierstrass both played a role here. Kronecker did not accept infinite sets, and it seems that Weierstrass did not accept that two infinite sets could be so different, with one being countable and the other not. Weierstrass changed his opinion later. Without the uncountability theorem, the article needed a title that did not refer to this theorem. Cantor chose "Ueber eine Eigenschaft des Inbegriffes aller reellen algebraischen Zahlen" ("On a Property of the Collection of All Real Algebraic Numbers"), which refers to the countability of the set of real algebraic numbers, the result that Weierstrass found useful.

Kronecker's influence appears in the proof of Cantor's second theorem. Cantor used Dedekind's version of the proof except he left out why the limits a∞ = limn → ∞ an and 
b∞ = limn → ∞ bn exist. Dedekind had used his "principle of continuity" to prove they exist. This principle (which is equivalent to the least upper bound property of the real numbers) comes from Dedekind's construction of the real numbers, a construction Kronecker did not accept.

Cantor restricted his first theorem to the set of real algebraic numbers even though Dedekind had sent him a proof that handled all algebraic numbers. Cantor did this for expository reasons and because of "local circumstances." This restriction simplifies the article because the second theorem works with real sequences. Hence, the construction in the second theorem can be applied directly to the enumeration of the real algebraic numbers to produce "an effective procedure for the calculation of transcendental numbers." This procedure would be acceptable to Weierstrass.

Dedekind's contributions to Cantor's article

Since 1856, Dedekind had developed theories involving infinitely many infinite sets—for example: ideals, which he used in algebraic number theory, and Dedekind cuts, which he used to construct the real numbers. This work enabled him to understand and contribute to Cantor's work.

Dedekind's first contribution concerns the theorem that the set of real algebraic numbers is countable. Cantor is usually given credit for this theorem, but the mathematical historian José Ferreirós calls it "Dedekind's theorem." Their correspondence reveals what each mathematician contributed to the theorem.

In his letter introducing the concept of countability, Cantor stated without proof that the set of positive rational numbers is countable, as are sets of the form (an1, n2, ..., nν) where n1, n2, ..., nν, and ν are positive integers. Cantor's second result uses an indexed family of numbers: a set of the form (an1, n2, ..., nν) is the range of a function from the ν indices to the set of real numbers. His second result implies his first: let ν = 2 and an1, n2 = . The function can be quite general—for example, an1, n2, n3, n4, n5 =  + 

Dedekind replied with a proof of the theorem that the set of all algebraic numbers is countable. In his reply to Dedekind, Cantor did not claim to have proved Dedekind's result. He did indicate how he proved his theorem about indexed families of numbers: "Your proof that (n) [the set of positive integers] can be correlated one-to-one with the field of all algebraic numbers is approximately the same as the way I prove my contention in the last letter. I take n12 + n22 + ··· + nν2 =  and order the elements accordingly." However, Cantor's ordering is weaker than Dedekind's and cannot be extended to -tuples of integers that include zeros.

Dedekind's second contribution is his proof of Cantor's second theorem. Dedekind sent this proof in reply to Cantor's letter that contained the uncountability theorem, which Cantor proved using infinitely many sequences. Cantor next wrote that he had found a simpler proof that did not use infinitely many sequences. So Cantor had a choice of proofs and chose to publish Dedekind's.

Cantor thanked Dedekind privately for his help: "… your comments (which I value highly) and your manner of putting some of the points were of great assistance to me." However, he did not mention Dedekind's help in his article. In previous articles, he had acknowledged help received from Kronecker, Weierstrass, Heine, and Hermann Schwarz. Cantor's failure to mention Dedekind's contributions damaged his relationship with Dedekind. Dedekind stopped replying to his letters and did not resume the correspondence until October 1876.

The legacy of Cantor's article
Cantor's article introduced the uncountability theorem and the concept of countability. Both would lead to significant developments in mathematics. The uncountability theorem demonstrated that one-to-one correspondences can be used to analyze infinite sets. In 1878, Cantor used them to define and compare cardinalities. He also constructed one-to-one correspondences to prove that the n-dimensional spaces Rn (where R is the set of real numbers) and the set of irrational numbers have the same cardinality as R.

In 1883, Cantor extended the positive integers with his infinite ordinals. This extension was necessary for his work on the Cantor–Bendixson theorem. Cantor discovered other uses for the ordinals—for example, he used sets of ordinals to produce an infinity of sets having different infinite cardinalities. His work on infinite sets together with Dedekind's set-theoretical work created set theory.

The concept of countability led to countable operations and objects that are used in various areas of mathematics. For example, in 1878, Cantor introduced countable unions of sets. In the 1890s, Émile Borel used countable unions in his theory of measure, and René Baire used countable ordinals to define his classes of functions. Building on the work of Borel and Baire, Henri Lebesgue created his theories of measure and integration, which were published from 1899 to 1901.

Countable models are used in set theory. In 1922, Thoralf Skolem proved that if conventional axioms of set theory are consistent, then they have a countable model. Since this model is countable, its set of real numbers is countable. This consequence is called Skolem's paradox, and Skolem explained why it does not contradict Cantor's uncountability theorem: although there is a one-to-one correspondence between this set and the set of positive integers, no such one-to-one correspondence is a member of the model. Thus the model considers its set of real numbers to be uncountable, or more precisely, the first-order sentence that says the set of real numbers is uncountable is true within the model. In 1963, Paul Cohen used countable models to prove his independence theorems.

See also
Cantor's theorem

Notes

Note on Cantor's 1879 proof

References

Bibliography
 .
 .
 .
 .
 .
 .
 .
 .
 .
 .
 .
 .
 .
 . 
 .
 .
 .
 .
 .
 .
 .
 .
 .
 .
 .
 .
 . 
 . (Reprinted by Dover Publications, 2002.)
 .
 .
 .
 .
 .
 .
 .

Georg Cantor
History of mathematics
Real analysis
Set theory